is a Japanese tokusatsu drama and the 29th entry in the Kamen Rider series. It follows the exploits of Sougo Tokiwa, a young man who, according to visitors from the future, is destined to become the king who will enslave the entire world, and embarks in a quest to change his fate, meeting several other Kamen Riders from the Heisei era along the way.

Main characters

Sougo Tokiwa
 is an 18-year old student, later 19-year old graduate, of  who dreamed of becoming a king after experiencing a series of nightmares in his childhood and being visited by a mysterious figure who entrusted him with the prophecy. After surviving a bus accident when he was nine, Sougo became orphaned and since then lived with his great-uncle at 9-to-5. After meeting Tsukuyomi and Geiz, Sougo learns he will become Ohma Zi-O, a tyrant destined to rule the world with an iron fist. Despite being troubled by this possibility, Sougo chooses to continue following his dream while changing his fate, accepting the power to become Kamen Rider Zi-O and declaring that he will become a benevolent tyrant instead. Despite Geiz and Tsukuyomi's reservations, Sougo considers them friends and trusts them with his life, asking both of them to kill him should he follow the path to becoming Ohma Zi-O. All the while, Sougo's predecessor Tsukasa Kadoya secretly watches over him to ensure he succeeds in changing his fate.

Originally a visionary high school student prior to his graduation, Sougo develops other strengths along his journey. Due to his observant nature and keen understanding of human behavior, he became a skilled manipulator capable of outsmarting a genius of Kuroto Dan's caliber. In 2019, Sougo develops the ability to subconsciously create alternate futures, which he initially assumed were prophetic dreams of Kamen Riders from White Woz's timeline. Ever since the bus accident, he also gained chronokinesis like the Time Jackers. However, their leader Swartz erased Sougo's memory of it before the latter regains his powers after he becomes Grand Zi-O.

As Swartz commences a convergence of the A.R. Worlds, Tsukuyomi seemingly betrays Sougo and Geiz is killed saving him. In response, an enraged Sougo becomes Kamen Rider Ohma Zi-O to defeat Swartz himself before sacrificing his newfound power to reset the timeline, negating his destiny and undoing Swartz's damage. Due to this, he relives his senior year in 2018 with altered versions of Geiz, Tsukuyomi, and the Time Jackers as his classmates in the new timeline.

In the sequel special Kamen Rider Zi-O Next Time: Geiz, Majesty, Sougo regains his Rider powers while helping Geiz in his fight against a new White Woz, who became Another Diend to become a savior.

In an alternate timeline depicted in the film Kamen Rider Zi-O the Movie: Over Quartzer, Sougo and his friends help Go Shijima preserve Kamen Rider Drive's history after Oda Nobunaga lost the Battle of Nagashino. Despite succeeding, Black Woz betrays him, taking all of Sougo's Ride Watches and imprisoning him on behalf of the Quartzers. Despite this, Sougo is released by Tsukuyomi and Go and receives the Ohma Zi-O Ride Watch to defeat the Quartzers' leader, an adult version of himself from an alternate timeline. After Sougo defeats his evil counterpart, he is recognized as a king.

In the web-exclusive spin-offs, Rider Time: Kamen Rider Decade vs. Zi-O: The Decade House Death Game and Rider Time: Kamen Rider Zi-O vs. Decade: 7 of Zi-Os!, an alternate universe version of Sougo who became a basketball player becomes trapped in the titular House Death Game and encounters Tsukasa, who was trying to lure the "prime" version of Sougo to the game. The alternative Sougo gives Tsukasa the Saber Ride Watch and asks him to give it to the "prime" Sougo, who is later forced to fight various alternate universe versions of himself.

Additionally, he possesses other Ride Watches that allow him to access forms based on his Heisei Kamen Rider predecessors, which are as follows:

: A Kamen Rider Build Rabbit Tank Form-themed form accessed from the  Ride Watch that grants increased agility and arms him with the  tekko, themed after Build's Drill Crusher. This form first appears in the film Kamen Rider Build the Movie: Be the One.
: A Kamen Rider Ex-Aid Action Gamer Level 2-themed form accessed from the  Ride Watch that grants the ability to generate a  digital field with chocolate block-like platforms and equips him with the  gauntlets, themed after Ex-Aid's Gashacon Breaker.
: A Kamen Rider Fourze Base States-themed form accessed from the  Ride Watch that grants flight capabilities via an alternate  form and equips him with the  gauntlets, themed after Fourze's Rocket Module.
: A Kamen Rider Gaim Orange Arms-themed form accessed from the  Ride Watch that grants the ability to open  portals and arms him with four  swords, themed after Gaim's Daidaimaru.
This form first appears in the crossover film Kamen Rider Heisei Generations Forever.
: A Kamen Rider Kuuga Mighty Form-themed form accessed from the  Ride Watch that grants increased hand-to-hand combat capabilities. This form first appears in the crossover film Kamen Rider Heisei Generations Forever.
Additionally, he can augment himself with one of his Rider predecessors' power-up forms by combining the Decade Ride Watch with their corresponding Ride Watch, which are as follows:
: A Kamen Rider Build Rabbit Tank Sparkling Form-themed form accessed from the Decade and Build Ride Watches.
: A Kamen Rider Ghost Grateful Damashii-themed form accessed from the Decade and Ghost Watches.
: A Kamen Rider Ex-Aid Double Action Gamer Level XX-themed form accessed from the Decade and Ex-Aid Ride Watches that splits him into the azure-colored Ex-Aid Form L, who wields the Zikan Girade, and the orange-colored Ex-Aid Form R, who wields the Ride Heisaber.
: A Kamen Rider OOO Tajadol Combo-themed form accessed from the Decade and OOO Ride Watches.
: A Kamen Rider Ryuki Survive-themed form accessed from the Decade and Ryuki Ride Watches. This form appears exclusively in the web series spin-off Rider Time: Kamen Rider Ryuki.
: A Kamen Rider Saber Brave Dragon-themed form accessed by combining the Decade and Saber Ride Watches. This form appears exclusively in Rider Time: Kamen Rider Zi-O vs. Decade: 7 of Zi-Os!.

Amidst his journey, Sougo acquires unique Ride Watches that allow him to access stronger forms, which are as follows:

: A super form accessed from the two-in-one  that grants limited chronokinesis and precognitive sight, which allows him to see seconds into the future. In this form, Zi-O wields the  sword, which can combine with the Zikan Girade to form the  broadsword for him to perform the  finisher.
: A fusion form between Kamen Riders Zi-O, Geiz, and Woz accessed from the  Ride Watch that allows the trio to utilize all of their powers and weapons at once.
: An alternate fusion form that replaces Woz with Tsukuyomi. This form appears exclusively in the Kamen Rider Zi-O tie-in novel of the same name.
: Zi-O's second strongest form accessed from the  Ride Watch that grants chronokinesis, the ability to summon any of his predecessors from their active timeline to fight by his side, and utilize their weapons along with his own.
: A unique form accessed from Ohma Zi-O's personal Ride Watch that grants the vast power of Zi-O's future self. This form appears exclusively in the film Kamen Rider Zi-O the Movie: Over Quartzer.
Kamen Rider Ohma Zi-O: Zi-O's strongest form accessed from the Ohma Zi-O Driver that grants the power to destroy enemies with a single attack.

In addition to his own Ride Watches, Sougo is capable of using Geiz's Ride Watches. 
Ghost Armor: A Kamen Rider Ghost-themed form accessed from the Ghost Ride Watch, the original of which Geiz stole from Ohma Zi-O before Sougo acquires his own version, that allows him to perform the  finisher.

Sougo Tokiwa is portrayed by  while  and  portray him as a child and younger child, respectively.

Mirror Sougo Tokiwa
The  is a cynical and power-hungry version of the original Sougo from the Mirror World. Meeting his real world counterpart during the events of Another Ryuga's reign of terror, Mirror Sougo torments his counterpart over his perceived futile attempt at defying his fate as Ohma Zi-O. When Sougo reaffirms his belief and acknowledges his darker self, the Mirror Sougo concedes and gives the former half of the Zi-O Ridewatch II. Like his real life counterpart, the Mirror Sougo can also transform into Zi-O, with his suit being a mirrored copy of the original.

In the Kamen Rider Zi-O novel, another version of Mirror Sougo is brought into existence when the Third Woz interferes with the timeline. This Mirror Sougo fuses with his real world counterpart to become  and collect most of the Another Watches to become Another Ohma Zi-O. He later joins forces with Third Woz to obtain the Decade Ride Watch and manipulate the original timeline so that Sougo never meets Geiz and Tsukuyomi and ensure he becomes Ohma Zi-O. After absorbing Geiz and Tsukuyomi's Another Watches to become , Inner Sougo is defeated Zi-O Trinity Version Geiz & Tsukuyomi.

Mirror Sougo Tokiwa is portrayed by So Okuno, who also portrays the real world version of Sougo Tokiwa.

Alternate Sougo Tokiwa
In the Rider Time web series Decade VS Zi-O and Zi-O VS Decade, several alternate timeline iterations of Sougo Tokiwa are introduced as supporting characters, each of whom retain the ability to transform into Zi-O. Excluding the android Sougo, the rest of the alternate Sougos are addressed alphabetically, with the "prime" Sougo designated as "A". Most of the alternative versions are hunted down and killed by Tsukasa in order to prevent the merging of alternate universes caused by the True Sougo.

Android: The android Sougo Tokiwa is a basketball player who hails from a dimension where humanity has been wiped out and replaced by robots. In Decade VS Zi-O, the android Sougo is one of the many participants in True Sougo's "King's Death Game" and bonds with the ghost of Misa Kuon. He later joins Tsukasa's party of Kamen Riders in fighting True Sougo. However, as he is incapable of harnessing a fellow Rider's Ridewatch, he hands Tsukasa the Saber Ridewatch in the hopes that someone else can use it.
After surviving the King's Death Game, Sougo B returns to his universe on good terms with Sougo A.
Sougo C: A manipulative  student who used bribery to win his school's presidency and conspires with Misa to kill Sougo A. However, he swaps places with Sougo A and is killed by Decade.
Sougo D: A yankī who was killed by Tsukasa.
Sougo E: A childish student who was killed by Ohma Zi-O.
Sougo F: A cowardly student who was killed by Decade.

As with the original Sougo Tokiwa, the alternate Sougos are portrayed by So Okuno.

Geiz Myokoin
While he travels back in time to kill Sougo before he can become Ohma Zi-O, Geiz momentarily relents after Sougo saves him while fighting the Another Rider, Another Build. At Tsukuyomi's request, Geiz agrees to stay his hand and watch events play out, becoming an on-again-off-again house guest of Sougo's. Over the course of the series, Geiz struggles with his desire to stop Ohma Zi-O and his growing friendship with Sougo before Geiz eventually becomes more open about his feelings and accepts Sougo as his friend following Another Zi-O's attacks.

After defeating Another Zi-O II, Geiz discovers the future he came from is actually an alternate dimension where Ohma Zi-O continues to exist despite Sougo's efforts to avoid becoming him. During Sougo's final battle with Swartz, Geiz dies protecting the former and begs him to become Ohma Zi-O to defeat Swartz with his dying breath.

In the sequel special Kamen Rider Zi-O Next Time: Geiz, Majesty, Geiz is visited by a new iteration of White Woz, who restores his Rider powers. After meeting several past secondary Riders and seeing White Woz become the monstrous Another Diend to endanger Sougo, Geiz receives the Geiz Majesty Ride Watch from Daiki Kaito and defeats White Woz. Afterwards, Geiz permanently regains his original timeline memories and returns to his regular life.

Similarly to Sougo, Geiz uses a Ziku-Driver in conjunction with the  Ride Watch to transform. Moreover, he possesses his own series of Ride Watches, which he can use to access the following forms:

: A Kamen Rider Ghost Ore Damashii-themed form accessed from the  Ride Watch that grants levitation, invisibility, and intangibility.
: A unique Yurusen-themed form accessed from the  Ride Watch, which was temporarily created from the Ghost Ride Watch, that allows him to perform the  finisher. This form appears exclusively in the "Hyper Battle DVD" special Kamen Rider Bi Bi Bi no Bibill Geiz.
: A Kamen Rider Drive Type Speed-themed form accessed from the  Ride Watch that grants superhuman speed and the use of the twin  drones, themed after Drive's Shift Speed Car, for combat assistance.
: A Kamen Rider Faiz-themed form accessed from the  Ride Watch that grants the ability to summon either the  knuckleduster, themed after Faiz's SB-555C Faiz Shot, or the  flashlight, themed after Faiz's SB-555L Faiz Pointer, via his  device, themed after Faiz's SB-555P Faiz Phone.
: A Kamen Rider Wizard Flame Style-themed form accessed from the  Ride Watch that grants the ability to cast spells based on Wizard's Wizard Rings.
: A Kamen Rider Genm Action Gamer Level 2-themed form accessed from the  Ride Watch that grants the use of Genm's abilities.

Furthermore, Geiz also possesses unique Ride Watches that allow him to access stronger forms, which are as follows:

: A speed-oriented form that grants flight capabilities and allows him to perform the  finisher.
: Geiz's strongest form accessed from the  Ride Watch that allows him to channel the combined powers and weapons of all 18 secondary Heisei Kamen Riders.

In addition to his own Ride Watches, Geiz is capable of using Zi-O's Ride Watches.
Build Armor: A Kamen Rider Build-themed form accessed from the Build Ride Watch that allows him to perform the  finisher.
Ex-Aid Armor: A Kamen Rider Ex-Aid-themed form accessed from the Ex-Aid Ride Watch that allows him to perform the Critical Time Burst.

Tsukuyomi
, real name , is a mysterious 18-year-old girl of nobility from the year 2068 and the younger sister of Time Jacker leader, Swartz. She was chosen to succeed her parents due to her chronokinetic powers, though Swartz intended to use her for his own ends. When she hesitated to stop him, he erased her memories and stranded her in Ohma Zi-O's timeline, where she ended up with a resistance movement against him under a new name. Disapproving of Geiz's plan to kill Sougo in 2018 for fear of damaging the timeline, she travels back in time with him to help Sougo avert his future through gentler means.

Initially, Tsukuyomi finds it difficult to believe the kindly Sougo could become the tyrannical Ohma Zi-O. As his Rider powers grow in strength however, she becomes paranoid and demands Geiz kill Sougo. When the former refuses, she travels back in time to the latter's childhood to do it herself. However, she discovers Swartz orchestrated everything that had happened throughout the series, including Sougo becoming Zi-O. While trying to save the younger Sougo from her brother, Tsukuyomi inadvertently causes the bus accident that claimed Sougo's parents' lives as well as severe damage to the timeline. She is saved by Tsukasa Kadoya, who shows her how Swartz kidnapped all of the children on the bus as they all had the potential to become Zi-O.

Realizing her mistake and that Sougo becoming Ohma Zi-O was one of many possible futures, a repentant Tsukuyomi makes amends with Sougo and Geiz. Soon after, she begins to slowly regain her memories after rediscovering her powers and meeting her younger self in 2058. Amidst Another Zi-O II's attacks, Tsukuyomi is captured by the Time Jackers so Swartz can reveal their original past to her before taking her powers. As she fully regains her original memories, Black Woz rescues her once Another Zi-O II is defeated.

When Swartz causes a convergence of the Kamen Rider multiverse, he attempts to kill Tsukuyomi since she had the power to stop him. However, Sougo had given a past version of her a blank Ride Watch that he infused with Ohma Zi-O's power, which activates during the calamity's height. Once Black Woz provides her with a Ziku-Driver, Tsukuyomi gains the power become  to mortally wound Swartz before he kills her in retaliation.

In the sequel special Kamen Rider Zi-O Next Time: Geiz, Majesty, Tsukuyomi permanently regains her memories and Rider powers while helping Geiz in his fight against Another Diend.

For most of the series, Tsukuyomi possesses her own Faiz Phone X for self-defense purposes and to communicate with her friends through time. She also owns a Time Mazine, which she lends to Sougo in the hopes of assisting him with time travel. Following Sougo's battle with the monstrous Another Agito, Tsukuyomi regains her ability to stop time. After becoming Kamen Rider Tsukuyomi, she gains the ability to generate an energy sword from her hand and perform the  finisher.

Tsukuyomi is portrayed by  while  portrays her as a child.

Woz
The name  refers to two prophets from different futures who each herald a particular figure in hopes of ensuring the path to their respective futures. The name was originally held by Black Woz until White Woz's arrival in 2019, with Sougo providing distinction by labeling them with their outfits' predominant colors.

Both versions of Woz can use the  belt to become . Additionally, they can use unique Ride Watches called  to access forms based on future Kamen Riders called , which are as follows:

: A Kamen Rider Shinobi-themed form accessed from the  MiRide Watch that grants the use of various ninja-related powers, such as making copies of himself and traveling through shadows.
: A Kamen Rider Quiz-themed form accessed from the  MiRide Watch that grants worldwide knowledge and the ability to determine the answer to a riddle for their targets. As the original Kamen Rider Quiz attacks through riddles, Woz does so as well while using this form. However, this ability can be negated if the riddle's answer is debatable or if Woz does not know the answer.
: A Kamen Rider Kikai-themed form accessed from the  MiRide Watch that grants the ability to turn nearby humans into manipulable .
: Woz's strongest form accessed from the  MiRide Watch that grants cosmic powers, the ability to perform the  finisher, and access to two sub-forms:
: A form that allows him to control planetary energy and perform the  finisher.
: A form that allows him to control pyrokinetic energy and perform the  finisher.

Black Woz
He also takes on the role of narrator for the series and interacts with the viewers to recount Sougo's adventures. After giving Sougo his Rider powers and despite learning of his intention to become a benevolent lord instead of a tyrant, a surprised Black Woz remains loyal to him as the latter's only concern is assuring Sougo's destiny of becoming Ohma Zi-O regardless by providing his services and occasionally intervening to rescue the youth from harm. Woz's dedication to ensuring his ruler's history initially made him fickle towards Sougo's friends and the Time Jackers, helping either side whenever Woz believed Sougo is straying too far from the intended path.

After being attacked and wounded by Geiz Revive, Black Woz forms a temporary alliance with the Time Jacker Heure to steal White Woz's Rider powers so he can force Geiz to overuse his Revive form and kill him. However, Sougo's influence on him causes Black Woz to support the former's decision to change his future. Because of this, once Sougo and Geiz settle their differences, Black Woz makes peace with Geiz and Tsukuyomi and moves in with them and Sougo. Despite being caught off-guard when Sougo transforms into Ohma Zi-O to defeat Swartz before sacrificing his power to fix the timeline, Black Woz remains unaffected and continues to watch over Sougo in the new timeline.

During the events of the stage show Kamen Rider Zi-O: Final Stage, Black Woz is temporarily turned into the villainous and overzealous Tsukuyomi supporter, before returning to his senses.

Throughout the series, Black Woz has a habit of declaring  whenever Sougo obtains a new Ride Watch and Ride Armor, to point where he becomes pleased when Sougo asks him to do so. While he usually does this for Sougo, Black Woz begrudgingly does so once for Geiz when the latter attains his Majesty form. Black Woz also demonstrates special skills such as deflecting Another Fourze's attack with one hand and using his scarf to teleport himself and others. Additionally, he can also travel through time without using a Time Mazine. Prior to obtaining Kamen Rider Woz's powers, Black Woz could use the Ohma Advent Calendar to trap his target and destroy SOUGO's time portals by ripping out the book's pages. In Kamen Rider Heisei Generations Forever, Black Woz is able to access Philip's Gaia Library to learn more about Imagin and give Sougo information about them.

White Woz
 is a version of Woz who hails from an alternate future that came into being after Sougo temporarily renounced his Rider powers and is fanatically devoted to Geiz, who by his time defeated Ohma Zi-O as Geiz Revive.Despite sharing a common goal with Geiz and Tsukuyomi, White Woz's apathetic and sadistic approach along with his desire to see his future come to pass puts them at odds. After getting MiRide Watches from three future Kamen Riders, he uses their combined power to create the Geiz Revive Ride Watch and presents it to Geiz.

Not long after however, the Time Riders learn that White Woz only needed Geiz to defeat Ohma Zi-O to ensure his own existence, regardless if Geiz survives or not, and has been helping Swartz the entire time. After being tricked into transferring his Rider powers to Black Woz and Geiz and Sougo making peace with each other, White Woz begins to fade away due to his timeline being erased. Despite this, he realizes he should not have supported Swartz and combines his residual Rider energy with the Zi-O II and Geiz Revive Ride Watches to create the Zi-O Trinity Ride Watch. Accepting his fate, White Woz warns Black Woz of Swartz's goals before fully fading away. Weeks later, as part of the final phase of his endgame, Swartz summons an Another World version of White Woz to distract Black Woz. However, the former learns the full extent of Swartz's plans and attempts to tell the Time Riders, but vanishes due to Another World's destruction before he could do so.

In the sequel special Kamen Rider Zi-O Next Time: Geiz, Majesty, a second Another World version of White Woz appears in the rewritten timeline to kill Geiz and steal Daiki Kaito's Rider powers to become Another Diend to manufacture disasters and pass himself as a savior. After Geiz Majesty defeats him, this White Woz's essence is absorbed into Black Woz while Kaito regains his powers.

While he lacks Black Woz's abilities, the original White Woz possesses a tablet book-like device that allows him to manipulate the flow of time, shift certain events' outcomes in his favor, and negate the Time Jackers' chronokinetic powers by simply writing or speaking whatever he wants to happen into it. Due to his home timeline being an alternate version of 2068, White Woz also has his own Time Mazine, which allows him to travel to alternate timelines.

As Another Diend, White Woz has the ability to manipulate an army of Kasshine, summon past Heisei era monsters via card-like constructs, and is capable of performing his own version of Diend's Dimension Shoot finisher.

Third Woz
The  is the main antagonist of the Kamen Rider Zi-O tie-in novel. Sometime after the events of the V-Cinema Geiz Majesty, he creates a new timeline where Inner Sougo rises to the title of Oma Zi-O through the power of Another Watches. Wanting to ensure the events leading to the original Oma Zi-O's ascension comes to pass, Third Woz conspires with Inner Sougo to transform the latter's versions of Geiz and Tsukuyomi into each other's Another Rider counterparts to lure Black Woz and Sougo to their timeline. Third Woz later steals Black Woz's Rider powers to transform into , only to be defeated by Zi-O II and cease to exist when the previous timeline is restored.

Like White Woz, Third Woz is armed with a tablet that can manipulate the flow of time to his favor.

Recurring characters

Junichirō Tokiwa
Even though his shop specializes in repairing clocks, he rarely has orders to fix them and usually repairs other old devices to make ends meet. In spite of this, he has demonstrated a form of intellect in repairing unique devices, such as Sougo's Ride Watches and Kamen Rider Den-O's DenLiner.

Ohma Zi-O
Due to his immense power, Tsukuyomi and Geiz travel back in time to 2018 in the hopes of intercepting Ohma Zi-O's past self and prevent his rise to power. When Tsukasa Kadoya sends Sougo and Tsukuyomi to 2068, Ohma Zi-O has them brought before him so he can mock his past self's naiveté and overpower him, advising him to renounce being Zi-O if he refuses to accept his destiny of becoming him before sending him back to 2018. Along the way however, Sougo and his friends discover that Ohma Zi-O is from a possible future and that his existence is fixed after a future where he was defeated by Geiz Revive came into existence. Furthermore, Sougo changed , the day he was to become Ohma Zi-O, when he became Zi-O Trinity instead.

When Swartz initiates his endgame, Sougo returns to 2068 to confront Ohma Zi-O for a final battle, deducing the tyrant never intended to kill him. The future Sougo reveals that his power to destroy time and space is stronger than Swartz's before sending his younger self back with a blank Ride Watch. While Sougo becomes Ohma Zi-O in 2019, he chooses to sacrifice the power to undo Swartz's damage to the timeline. Impressed by his younger self's choice, Ohma Zi-O peacefully lets himself be erased from existence.

In an alternate timeline depicted in the film Kamen Rider Zi-O the Movie: Over Quartzer, Ohma Zi-O's existence is revealed to be the result of the Quartzers' influence on Sougo's timeline and orchestrated by Sougo's original future counterpart, who intended to erase the Kamen Riders' influence on the Heisei era. Once he became aware of the Quartzers' plot, Ohma Zi-O supports his younger self in defeating their alternate self by giving him his personal Ride Watch.

In response, he instigates the King's Death Game to find a new host to inhabit and restore his full strength. After defeating Kamen Rider Decade's party of Kamen Riders, Ohma Zi-O merges six dimensions into the prime Sougo's universe, but is regressed into the form of an amnesiac young boy that Tsukuyomi takes care of. Upon regaining his memories, Ohma Zi-O defeats Decade, only to be distracted by Tsukuyomi and killed by Zi-O.

Like the Time Jackers, Ohma Zi-O has chronokinetic abilities, which are powerful enough to destroy an entire army of resistance fighters within seconds and summon a past Heisei Rider from their time period to his aid. While he also possesses Ride Watches, he is able to utilize their individual powers by pressing their activation buttons.

Time Jackers
The  are a group of time travelers brought together by Swartz, who gifted his subordinates with the ability to freeze time, that seek to prevent Ohma Zi-O's existence by replacing him with an Another Rider. While claiming this goal is just, they are either apathetic to the consequences of altering the timeline or unconcerned with spoiling future events.

Following the Time Jackers' defeat at the end of the series, Finis attempts to seek revenge during the events of the film Kamen Rider Reiwa: The First Generation, only to be defeated like her fellow Time Jackers.

Swartz 
 is the cool-headed and ruthless leader of the Time Jackers and Tsukuyomi's older brother. Preferring to take the direct approach, he sees friend and foe alike as pawns in his schemes. Originally from an alternate version of 2058, Swartz sought to protect his reality by destroying the multiverse and rule all of time and space. In his youth, he was irate over being passed over to succeed his parents, whose power he intended to use in his goals. When Tsukuyomi attempted to stop him, he stranded her in Ohma Zi-O's timeline with no memory of her past.

After growing older, Swartz commenced a long-term plot by forming the Time Jackers and influencing Sougo's life by installing his dream of becoming king; orchestrating the events that would lead to him becoming Zi-O and create the ideal conditions for fulfilling his ambition. Swartz also orchestrates Hiryū becoming Another Zi-O II to capture Tsukuyomi and take her powers along with those of Tsukasa Kadoya's before abandoning both the Time Jackers and Hiryū once they serve their purpose as he initiates a multiversal convergence. However, Swartz meets his end when Sougo becomes Ohma Zi-O and kills him before using his powers to undo the former's damage. In the new timeline, Swartz became Sougo's contemporary principal.

Swartz possesses teleportation, memory manipulation, and powerful chronokinetic abilities that allow him to freeze time. He can also travel to alternate timelines, something normal Time Mazines are incapable of doing, and bestow a weaker form of his chronokinetic powers unto others, which he can take back at his leisure. Swartz later acquires the ability to become the monstrous , gaining the ability to manipulate Dimensional Walls like Tsukasa and Daiki Kaito, he can use them to attack or bind enemies as well as spirit people into his personal pocket dimension, so he can summon alternate reality versions of past Dark Riders to take their place.

Swartz is portrayed by  while  portrays him as a teenager.

Heure 
 is the youngest member of the Time Jackers, whose childishness conceals his cruelty and arrogance as he manipulates his targets into forming Another Rider contracts by doing something for them to place them in his debt. Due to his infantile personality, he quickly becomes displeased when things do not go his way and acts in a more ruthless manner to ensure his success. After Swartz and Ora use him as a host for the parasitic Another Kikai, Heure becomes wary of his fellow Time Jackers as well as suspicious over his leader's true goals. This, combined with his growing curiosity over the truth of "Ohma's Day", cause him to become more willing to work with Black Woz. When Swartz reveals his true colors and takes away his powers, Heure escapes with Ora to seek out the Time Riders' protection, only to be killed by her so she could ensure her own protection. After Sougo sacrifices his power as Ohma Zi-O to undo the Time Jackers' damage, Heure is revived as a contemporary classmate of Sougo's in the new timeline.

Like the other Time Jackers, Swartz gifted Heure chronokinetic abilities, though the latter also demonstrated telekinetic powers. Additionally, Heure pilots a personalized Time Mazine that resembles Kamen Rider Ghost's Captain Ghost, which can also transform into a copy of the Rider's Iguana Ghostriker.

Ora 
 is a female member of the Time Jackers with a calm, gentle disposition who prefers to use persuasion to form Another Rider contracts by exploiting targets while they are in a state of emotional distress. While appearing outwardly gentle, her patience has its limits, especially when dealing with her fellow Time Jackers. After Swartz takes her powers away to enact his own plans, a disillusioned Ora joins Heure to seek out the Time Riders for protection until she learns she is being hunted by the Paradox Roidmude. Vengeful and frightened, she kills Heure and returns to Swartz in an attempt to kill him as well, only for Swartz to see through her plan and kill her instead. After Sougo reverses the Time Jackers' damage, Ora is revived as a contemporary classmate of his in the new timeline.

Like the other Time Jackers, Swartz gifted Ora with chronokinetic abilities. She also pilots a personalized Time Mazine that resembles Kamen Rider Kiva's Castle Doran. After losing her chronokinetic abilities, she uses dark energy capable of obliterating targets.

Another Riders 
To defeat Another Riders, the Time Riders have to use a corresponding Ride Watch or one of their stronger forms. While the Time Jackers succeed in having their Another Riders replace most of the Heisei era Riders in history, Sougo uses Ohma Zi-O's powers to undo their damage.

Hiryū Kakogawa 
 is a young man capable of transforming into the Another Rider, . Like Sougo, he is a survivor of the bus accident caused by Swartz, who abducted them and the other children due to their potential to become Zi-O. As a result, Hiryū developed a misguided vendetta against Sougo. After his first defeat as Another Zi-O, Hiryū feels insulted by Sougo's attempts to empathize with him and became more arrogant and ruthless as he proceeds to acquire all 19 Heisei Another Watches to become , only to be defeated by Sougo a second time. Following this, Swartz abandons Hiryū while Daiki Kaito steals his Another Watch.

During the events of the stage show, Kamen Rider Zi-O: Final Stage, Hiryū joins forces with the remaining Quartzers and gains the means to become the second Kamen Rider Barlckxs before becoming  after he obtains Ride Watches based on Kamen Riders 1, 2, V3, Riderman, X, Amazon, and Stronger. While he manages to overwhelm the Time Riders with his new power, he is defeated by the combined efforts of Zi-O Ohma Form and Ohma Zi-O.

As Another Zi-O, Hiryū possesses Zi-O II's clairvoyance and a pair of clock hand-like swords, which he can combine into a naginata to perform a variation of Zi-O II's King Edge of Time Slash. He can also use the Heisei Another Riders' Another Watches to assume their forms. After becoming Another Zi-O II, Hiryū gains Grand Zi-O's chronokinetic powers and the ability to summon Another Riders from across time. His Another Watch, which is docked in a black version of the Ziku-Driver instead of being absorbed into his body, is able to reconstitute itself until Kamen Riders Zi-O and Decade join forces to destroy it.

Hiryū Kakogawa is portrayed by  while  portrays him as a child.

Heisei Another Riders 
: An Another Rider based on Kamen Rider Build with the ability to shoot flaming basketballs from his hands, access the individual powers of Build's Rabbit and Tank Fullbottles, distill athletes' essences into , and use them to augment himself. He was originally a young basketball player from 2017 whom Heure saved from his predestined death by car accident. One year later, Another Build attacks Sougo before the latter transforms into Kamen Rider Zi-O and defeats him. However, Heure revives the monster with increased power. In response, Zi-O and Geiz travel back in time to 2017 to defeat Another Build's past iteration. Following this, the basketball player is left with no memory of being Another Build, though his death was still averted due to Heure's earlier actions.
: An Another Rider based on Kamen Rider Ex-Aid and the Bugsters. He has the ability to perform inhuman feats based on platform games, travel into , and summon  foot soldiers to aid him. After being defeated by Zi-O in 2016, Keisuke is put under Hiiro Kagami's care so he could be cured before his disease worsened.
: An alumnus of the Ryusei School who Ora gave the ability to become Another Faiz in 2003 to revive his childhood friend, and prolong her life by extracting bio-energy from girls who shared her age and birthday. By the time Sakuma and Karin attended Amanogawa High School in 2011, he loses the ability to become Another Faiz. To make up for this, Swartz gives him the ability to become Another Fourze. After facing Zi-O in 2011 and Geiz in 2003, Sakuma is defeated in both timelines, realizes he was hurting Karin more than he was helping her, and is forced to accept her death.
: An Another Rider based on Kamen Rider Fourze and the Zodiarts who can absorb or supply bio-energy and use the switches on his belt to summon  based on Fourze's Modules.
: An Another Rider Based on Kamen Rider Faiz who is also able to absorb bio-energy as well as summon a red aura to perform a variation of Faiz's Crimson Smash finisher. This was Sakuma's original Another Rider form until it died out in 2011 and was revived following Another Fourze's defeat.
: An Another Rider based on Kamen Rider Wizard armed with a ring that lets him channel his template's Wizard Rings' abilities. He was originally , who uses his powers to support the theater he works at and impress its owner, whom he has a crush on. Due to his inability to confess his feelings however, Kaori became engaged to another man, causing Hayase to seek revenge. After Geiz intercepts his past self in 2012 and destroys his Another Watch, he and Sougo help the present Hayase make contact with his past self and encourage him to confess his feelings regardless of what happens.
: An Another Rider based on Kamen Rider OOO and the Greeed. See here.
: An Another Rider based on Kamen Rider Gaim and the Overlords. He is armed with a zanbatō, the ability to create zipper-like portals, or Cracks, that connect to a pseudo- pocket dimension, and command over an army of Inves-like monsters. He was originally  of the dance group Team Baron before he was ousted by his leader, Kaito Kumon in 2013. After becoming Another Gaim, Asura takes over Team Baron and banishes anyone who challenges him to Helheim. Though he is defeated by Zi-O in 2013, this was undone by the "Man of the Beginning" so Sougo can rescue Geiz after he was trapped in Helheim. Once he does so, the future Sougo returns to 2013 to defeat Another Gaim permanently while his present self does the same.
: An Another Rider based on Kamen Rider Ghost who can use his chest-mounted eye to absorb human souls for use as a hoodie armament, summon Gamma Commando-like familiars and Hoodie Ghosts for support, and perform a variation of Ghost's Omega Drive finisher. He was originally , a policeman from 2015 who was killed in the line of duty and forced to become Another Ghost after refusing Heure's offer to be saved.
: An Another Rider based on Kamen Rider Den-O who possesses four swords and can travel through time on the  bullet train.
The first Another Den-O the Time Riders encountered was Ataru Hisanaga, who was used by the Super Time Jacker Tid and defeated by the original Kamen Rider Den-O in 2018 during the events of the film Kamen Rider Heisei Generations Forever.
The second Another Den-O was originally , who blames the death of his late sister, on her remorseful boyfriend, . After Ora turns him into Another Den-O in 2019, Takuya attempts to steal Den-O's DenLiner so he can go back in time to 2017 and prevent Sayuri's death. While in the past and fending off the Time Riders, Den-O, Kamen Rider Zeronos, and a Mole Imagin that Yukihiro unintentionally formed a contract with, the past Takuya learns his sister's death was caused by his future Another Rider self. His future self gains assistance from a pack of Mole Imagin before they are defeated by Grand Zi-O, Den-O, and Zeronos while past Takuya reconciles with Yukihiro.
: An Another Rider based on Kamen Rider W who possesses aerokinesis and can utilize the Luna Memory's power.
Another Kuuga: An Another Rider based on Kamen Rider Kuuga and the Grongi. See here.
: Also known as Kamen Rider Ryuga, he originally existed outside of the primary Kamen Rider timeline before Heure summoned Ryuga to turn him into an Another Rider version of himself.
Another Ryuki: An Another Rider based on Kamen Rider Ryuki. In addition to Tatsuya Kanō and a version under Hiryu's command, a third Another Ryuki appears in the Rider Time web series Decade VS Zi-O as a servant and obstacle in True Sougo's King's Death Game.
: An Another Rider based on Kamen Rider Blade. See here.
 Army: A zombie-like Time Jacker variant based on the original Another Agito.
: An Another Rider based on Kamen Rider Hibiki and the Makamou. He was originally , a disciple of the current Kamen Rider Hibiki, Kyosuke Kiriya, as well as Sougo's childhood friend. After Tsutomu left Kiriya because his master felt he was inadequate to take on the Hibiki title from his master, Tsuzumiya was unwillingly turned into Another Hibiki despite wanting to become an oni in his own right. Once Kiriya accepts his responsibilities and properly becomes Kamen Rider Hibiki, he and Zi-O Trinity save Tsutomu and Kiriya reconciles with his student.
: An Another Rider based on Kamen Rider Kiva and the Fangire who can command Kiva's Arms Monsters and wield them in their weapon forms. She was originally , who became a serial killer in 2015 after being dumped by her ex-boyfriend  and beating his new girlfriend to death. Ora exploits her situation to turn Yūko into Another Kiva, but the latter's unstable mind makes her immune to the Time Jackers' control. After nearly manipulating Sougo into serving her, Geiz saves him before Kamen Rider Woz defeats her. Following this, Ora kills Yūko, who dies in Sougo's arms.
: An Another Rider based on Kamen Rider Kabuto and the Worms. See here.
Another Decade: An Another Rider based on Kamen Rider Decade and Chinomanako Diend. See here.
: An Another Rider based on Kamen Rider Drive, Mashin Chaser, and the Roidmudes. See here.
: An Another Rider based on Kamen Rider Diend and Chinomanako Diend. See here.
: An Another Rider based on Kamen Rider Tsukuyomi who appears exclusively in the Kamen Rider Zi-O tie-in novel of the same name. After Third Woz creates a new timeline, he brainwashes its version of Geiz into becoming Another Tsukuyomi in order to lure the "prime" Sougo and Black Woz. Another Tsukuyomi is defeated by Zi-O II.
: An Another Rider based on Kamen Rider Geiz who can evolve into , which is based on Kamen Rider Geiz Revive Shippu, and appears exclusively in the Kamen Rider Zi-O tie-in novel of the same name. After Third Woz creates a new timeline, he brainwashes its version of Tsukuyomi into becoming Another Geiz in order to lure the "prime" Sougo and Black Woz. She is defeated by Kamen Rider Woz.
Another Woz: See here.
Another Ohma Zi-O Trinity: See here.

Post-Heisei Another Riders 
Another Shinobi: Also known as Kamen Rider Shinobi, a future Rider who Sougo brought into existence. Swartz coerces Heure to turn Shinobi's present-day counterpart into an Another Rider version of himself.
: An Another Rider based on Kamen Rider Quiz who possesses the power to steal other people's intelligence and enhance his own. He was originally the father of Kamen Rider Quiz, a scientist obsessed with advancing his work, to the point where he neglected his family and uses his powers as Another Quiz to steal other researchers' knowledge. He is defeated by Kamen Rider Woz.
: An Another Rider based on Kamen Rider Kikai with its template's powers, the ability to conjure vines from its hands, fly, and fire missiles. Its true form is a parasitic insect that becomes its face, which can survive upon every defeat and latch onto any form of organic matter to recreate its Another Rider body. As a result of Sougo's innate ability to create alternate futures, he inadvertently creates Another Kikai as a counterpart to Kamen Rider Kikai. The Another Rider becomes a target of the Time Jackers, who seek its Another Watch, but the Time Riders are able to retrieve its MiRide Watch so Kamen Rider Woz can permanently defeat Another Kikai.
: An Another Rider based on Kamen Rider Zero-One and the Magias. See Will.

Shōwa Another Riders 
Another 1: An Another Rider based on Kamen Rider 1, an alternate universe version of 1 depicted in the film Kamen Rider The First, and Kamen Rider Core. See Finis.

Guest characters
: A loyal mechanical servant of Ohma Zi-O's, operated by a built-in AI unit, who wields a spear and can also utilize mechanical limbs for additional support. He is sent back in time to kill Geiz. After Sougo discards his Ziku-Driver, Kasshine is rendered inoperable before Swartz reprograms it to kill the boy despite no longer being a threat to the Time Jacker. However Sougo is able to defeat it once he regains his powers.
Future Kamen Riders: Riders who originate from possible future timelines that came into being due to Sougo's growing strength as Zi-O and gaining the ability to create such time periods. While each of the future Riders share the same  belt, they have different names and Driver attachments in each time period.
While transformed, he uses ninjutsu and elemental attacks, wields a ninjatō, and can perform the  finisher. By his time, Rentarō was chosen by his mentor, Master Gamano, to become Shinobi. Despite his proficiency in ninjutsu, the former is forced to play the role of a hapless ninja in order to hide his secret identity and defend his little sister Iroha until she turns 18. In 2019, Rentarō is an ordinary man who longs to protect the weak, as he has a personal stake due to a troubled life as a weakling himself. However, he harbors vengeful feelings towards bullies, which Swartz uses to turn him into , granting him his future self's abilities. Though Rentarō is able to overcome his personal demons with Sougo's encouragement, Swartz brainwashes Rentarō into turning back into Another Shinobi before the latter is defeated by Kamen Rider Woz.
: A genius riddle enthusiast from 2040 who can transform into  via the  belt in conjunction with the  card. In battle, he asks his enemies questions that can determine the outcome of the battle depending on how they answer and can perform the  finisher. White Woz helps Mondo travel to 2019 to find his missing father, who disappeared before the latter was born. After fighting and working with the Time Riders to defeat Another Quiz, Mondo reconciles with his father and eventually returns to his time.
: A  from the year 2121 who can transform into  via the  belt in conjunction with the wrench-shaped  and the screwdriver-shaped . Due to being solar powered, Rento makes use of a satellite that stores and replenishes him with solar energy. Rento was originally part of a group of human-like androids called "Humanoises", who took over the world and hunted humanity to near extinction by 2121. After meeting a group of children, Rento befriended them and defected to defend humanity. Unlike the other future Riders, Rento was modeled after Sougo's robot toy, his sole "companion" during his childhood.
Born from a space-time disruption, Ginga arrived on Earth in 2019, intending to rule the universe with his unfathomable powers. In response, the Time Riders, the Time Jackers, and Another Kiva temporarily join forces to drive Ginga back to his home timeline.

Returning characters

As a special anniversary series, Kamen Rider Zi-O features cameos from actors of past Kamen Rider series from the Heisei era reprising their roles. While most characters appear in two episodes or the movies, the protagonists of Kamen Rider Decade play a more prominent role as reoccurring side characters directly involved in the series' plotline.

Spin-off exclusive characters
: A benevolent Imagin who appears exclusively in the film Kamen Rider Heisei Generations Forever. He forged a contract with Ataru Hisanaga to save his host's brother, Shingo, in the past. To grant Ataru's wish, he brings Sougo, Kamen Rider Build, and some of their friends to his host's world until Tid kidnaps Shingo. When a desperate Ataru tells Futaros to end the contract amidst Tid's invasion, the Imagin travels back in time to January 29, 2000 with Sougo and Ataru to try and save Shingo from Another W. After the Heisei Riders defeat Tid and the Hisanaga brothers are returned safely, Futaros leaves for parts unknown.
: A high school student and a Heisei Kamen Rider fan from the year 2018 who appears exclusively in the film Kamen Rider Heisei Generations Forever. He forged a contract with Futaros to meet Kamen Riders and leave his reality behind as his parents were more worried about his missing brother, Shingo. When he and Sougo travel back in time while following Futaros to find Shingo however, Ataru is forcibly transformed into Another Den-O. Due to Kamen Rider Den-O's status as a singularity, he and the original DenLiner crew are unaffected by the timeline changes, allowing them to defeat Another Den-O and save Ataru.
: Ataru's 7-year-old older brother from the year 2000 who appears exclusively in the film Kamen Rider Heisei Generations Forever. Due to his status as a singularity, Tid and his Another Riders kidnap Shingo. After escaping the Another Den-Liner on December 3, 2018, he encounters the Kamen Riders and Ataru while being pursued by the Another Riders, who eventually capture him so Tid can seal him. Shingo is later saved by the Heisei Kamen Riders and returned to his own time.
: A  capable of brainwashing and manipulating his targets who appears exclusively in Kamen Rider Heisei Generations Forever. Unlike the other Time Jackers, Tid's master plan is to erase the history of all Heisei Kamen Riders and become the ruler of the world. To do this, he creates the Kuuga Another Watch, which allows him to transform into the giant , so he can abduct and seal Shingo, whose status as a singularity made the boy a potential threat to his plans. After being defeated by Kamen Riders Zi-O and Build, Tid uses his Another Watch on Shingo to absorb him and evolve his Another Rider form into the larger, four-armed . However, he is ultimately defeated by the 20 Heisei Kamen Riders, killing him and freeing Shingo.
: Rentarō's younger sister who admires Kamen Rider Shinobi, unaware that he and her older brother are the same person. As she is also the princess of the evil Niji no Hebi clan, Rentarō strives to protect her. Like her brother, she is a ninja proficient in ninjutsu and skilled with using shuriken.
: Rentarō's childhood friend and son of the  CEO who can transform into . He harbors affections for Iroha, but after learning she only has eyes for Shinobi, he decides to defeat him in order to gain her love. When the Konjō Company hosts a tournament, Isamichi is forced to sabotage Iroha's examination due to said company forbidding nepotism. Later on, he joins forces with Shinobi when the Niji no Hebi target her. As Hattari, and similarly to Shinobi, he utilizes elemental attacks and a ninjatō in battle, can summon ninjas to aid him, and perform the  finisher.
: Rentarō's mentor who selected the youth to become Kamen Rider Shinobi after saving him. Having observed the Kagura family as a frog caricature and despite choosing him, Gamano views Rentarō as expendable to his agenda and leaves to recruit several more ninja Riders.
: A mysterious ninja from an evil ninja faction known as  who can transform into  and was responsible for turning Japan into a ninja-based country through the government by 2022. Despite being unaware of Iroha being their group's princess, Kagenosuke develops an affection for her and infiltrates a competition held by the Konjō Company to kidnap her. After being defeated and spared by Kamen Riders Shinobi and Hattari, Kagenosuke promises to return in the future.
: A young woman who was accidentally hit by her boyfriend Tatsuya in a car accident and was left hospitalized. After he became Another Ryuki and her soul became trapped in the Mirror World, she sets up a Rider War to find someone to stop him. Before she dies of her injuries, she begs Shinji Kido to save Tatsuya.
: A young man who inadvertently injured his girlfriend Sara in a car accident. Recognizing his plight, Kamen Rider Odin turns him into the Another Rider, and tasks him with stealing people's souls in order to save Sara. As Another Ryuki, he has similar powers as Another Ryuga and his original template. After learning Sara's soul had become trapped in the Mirror World and that she had set up a Rider War to find someone to stop him, Tatsuya becomes disheartened and realizes all he had done was for naught as he was only hurting Sara further. When she dies, Odin sees no more use for his pawn and sends Tatsuya into a berserker rage before Kamen Rider Zi-O saves the latter.
Mirror World Kamen Riders:
: A young man who became the new  in Sara's Rider War and sides with Shinji Kido, Miyuki Tezuka, and Ishida. Though he and his team are betrayed by Tezuka and ambushed by Ouja and Zolda, Kimura survives. After learning the truth about Ryuga, Kimura attempts to warn Shinji, but fails to stop Ryuga from possessing Shinji and beating Kimura before leaving him to be eaten by a Mirror Monster horde.
: A young man who became the new  in Sara's Rider War. He sides with Shinji Kido, Miyuki Tezuka, and Kimura, only to be murdered by a traitorous Tezuka.
: A young man who became the new . He sides with Jun Shibaura, Totsuka, and Tezuka before Shibaura and Tezuka silently kill him while having lunch.
: A young man who became the new  in Sara's Rider War. He sides with Jun Shibaura and Ishibashi before he is killed by Kamen Rider Ouja.
He is killed by Kamen Rider Knight.
: An infamous warlord from Japan's Sengoku period whom Sougo idolizes and hoped to emulate. He appears exclusively in Kamen Rider Zi-O the Movie: Over Quartzer.
: A ninja who serves under Nobunaga and appears exclusively in Kamen Rider Zi-O the Movie: Over Quartzer. Gyūzō is portrayed by 
: An ancestor of Krim Steinbelt from the Sengoku period who appears exclusively in Kamen Rider Zi-O the Movie: Over Quartzer. Realizing that time had been distorted and after learning of the Quartzers' attempts to kill her, Krim and his ally Kamen Rider Mach ask Sougo and his friends to protect Clara. Clara Steinbelt is portrayed by 
The : A mysterious group who view themselves as history's overseers and appear primarily in Kamen Rider Zi-O the Movie: Over Quartzer. The three leading Quartzers possess Ziku-Drivers that allow them to transform into Kamen Riders and utilize Ride Watches based on Kamen Riders whose media aired during the Heisei period but are recognized as Shōwa period Riders. The minor Quartzers are portrayed by YORI, TOMO, KIMI, U-YEAH, KENZO, and DAICHI of Da Pump.
While transformed, he can utilize three Ride Watches based on Kamen Rider Black RX, Bio Rider, and Robo Rider, perform his own variation of the Time Break finisher, and wields a weapon similar to the Shōwa Rider's Revolcane. Similar to Ohma Zi-O, Barlckxs can utilize the power of Ride Watches by pressing their activation buttons and combine Ride Watch powers. He established the conditions to bring about Ohma Zi-O, who he used as a kagemusha to secretly reshape the Heisei era to his liking and prevent Sougo from becoming Grand Zi-O. However, SOUGO is killed by Zi-O Ohma Form and the Heisei Kamen Riders, negating his influence in Ohma Zi-O's creation. The Leader of Quartzer is portrayed by ISSA of Da Pump.
: A high-ranking Quartzer who can transform into . While transformed, he utilizes three Ride Watches based on the last three Shōwa Kamen Riders who debuted in the early Heisei era: Kamen Riders Shin, ZO, and J. Unlike the other Quartzer Riders, Zonjis fights with brute strength in combat and can remove his armored cape to increase his offensive capabilities. He can also utilize Barlckx's Robo Rider Ride Watch to fire a barrage of missiles. He is killed by Kamen Rider Zero-One.
: A high-ranking Quartzer member who can transform into . While transformed, he wields a crossbow, can summon a Castle Doran-themed Time Mazine like Ora, and utilizes three Ride Watches based on the three protagonists of the Shōwa era-themed Heisei era web series Kamen Rider Amazons: Kamen Riders Amazon Omega, Amazon Alpha, and Amazon Neo. He is killed by Geiz and six of the Heisei Kamen Riders.
: A non-binary member of the Time Jackers who seeks to erase all Kamen Riders from history, believing that they are inherently evil, and appears exclusively in Kamen Rider Reiwa: The First Generation. Finis accomplishes their goal by traveling to the World of Zero-One and recruiting the Humagear Will to create an alternate timeline and attract Sougo. Despite absorbing most of Sougo's Rider powers and becoming the giant , Finis is killed by Kamen Riders Zi-O and Zero-One. As Another 1, Finis possesses a motorcycle-like lower body. After absorbing Geiz's Time Mazine, Another 1 evolves into , acquiring grasshopper-like appendages in place of the motorcycle.
: A young woman connected to various alternative timeline versions of Sougo who appears exclusively in the Rider Time web series Decade VS Zi-O and Zi-O VS Decade. In the former, Misa is the ghost of a deceased high school girl who participated in the King's Death Game and befriended an android version of Sougo Tokiwa. Before Tsukasa and android Sougo left to fight an alternate version of Ohma Zi-O, Misa passes on to the afterlife in the hopes of meeting Sougo in her reincarnation.

Notes

References

External links
Cast on TV Asahi

Zi-O
Characters
, Kamen Rider Zi-O
, Kamen Rider Zi-O
Fictional characters who can manipulate time